Thinodromus is a genus of beetles belonging to the family Staphylinidae.

The genus has cosmopolitan distribution.

Species:
 Thinodromus abnormalis (Cameron, 1930) 
 Thinodromus acuticollis (Bernhauer, 1927)

References

Staphylinidae
Staphylinidae genera